Waylon Albright "Shooter" Jennings (born May 19, 1979) is an American singer, songwriter, guitarist, and record producer. He is the son of country singers Waylon Jennings and Jessi Colter. In a career spanning over two decades, Shooter Jennings has explored a variety of genres as part of his eclectic sound.

Jennings made his debut with the single "4th of July" of his 2005 album “Put the "O" Back in Country” on Universal South, which peaked at No. 22 on the Billboard country charts. Jennings has since followed with six more full-length studio albums: Electric Rodeo (2006), The Wolf (2007), Black Ribbons (2009), Family Man (2012), The Other Life (2013) and Countach (For Giorgio) (2016), in addition to a live album, a compilation, and numerous EPs. In 2018, Jennings released his eighth album, called Shooter, under Dave Cobb’s Low Country Sound imprint label.

Early life 
Jennings was born in Nashville, Tennessee, on May 19, 1979. There are two different accounts regarding how he got his nickname "Shooter." His mother cited her, and husband Waylon Jennings', love of western culture and cowboy art for inspiring the gun-derived moniker. But his father said he came up with the name when, moments after the newborn emerged from his mother's womb, the boy sprayed a nurse before anyone could put on his first diaper. "I love my mom," says Jennings, "but I like Dad's version better. And I believe it's true. He didn't make [stuff] like that up."

He lived the first few years of his life in a crib on his parents' tour bus surrounded by the likes of Johnny Cash, Willie Nelson and Kris Kristofferson. By age 5, he was playing drums. At 8 years old, he began taking piano lessons. He started playing guitar at 14 and on occasion he'd play percussion in his father's band.

In high school Jennings fronted an industrial rock band called KilRaven for his high school's talent show. In 2011, he released the KilRaven track "Only You" on the album "Missed The Boat".

In 1996, Jennings and his father recorded an album together. They called it Fenixon (a play on the words "phoenix" and "son") but could not find a label to distribute it. Some of the material was remastered and used for the album Waylon Forever. The full Fenixon recording was finally released by Jennings' label Black Country Rock in 2014. Shooter Jennings is the uncle of William Harness, Professionally known as Struggle Jennings. Struggle Jennings grandmother, Jessi Colter, is the mother of Shooter Jennings.

Musical career

Stargunn 
In 2001, Jennings left Nashville, Tennessee, to seek his fortunes in Los Angeles. He assembled and performed with Stargunn, a rock band. The band featured Jennings on piano and lead vocals, Carter Falco, and Jonathan Boddie (later succeeded by Kevin Sciou) on guitar and background vocals, Curtis Roach on bass, and Lex Lipsitz on drums. Towards the end of 2001, Stargunn released their first album, The Only Way Up Is Down, and toured with Saliva, Tesla, Mark Ford and others in support of the album. That same year, Music Connection magazine listed Stargunn as one of the Hot 100 Unsigned Artists of 2001.

In 2002, Stargunn was featured on I've Always Been Crazy: A Tribute to Waylon Jennings, and the soundtrack to the Vince Vaughn film Made. Shortly after, Touchstone Pictures licensed the song "White Lines N Black Ties" for the film The Crew starring Burt Reynolds. Stargunn performed together for three years, built an avid following, and earned praise from the local music press. On March 30, 2003, Jennings dissolved Stargunn and began working on his solo career.

After the band's breakup, Jennings was twice presented with the opportunity to front the hard rock supergroup Velvet Revolver, but chose instead to pursue a solo career.

In 2015, Jennings' label Black Country Rock released Stargunn's debut album "The Only Way Up Is Down" on vinyl as part of Record Store Day.

Put the "O" Back in Country 
He returned to Los Angeles in 2004 to begin working on new material. In 2005 Jennings signed his first recording contract, with Universal South Records, releasing his debut album Put the "O" Back in Country that same year.

"Put the "O" Back in Country" produced his only entry on the Billboard Hot Country Songs charts in its lead-off single "Fourth of July", which peaked at No. 22. The album version of this song features a cameo appearance by George Jones, who sings the chorus to his signature song "He Stopped Loving Her Today" at the end; this guest appearance was removed from the song's radio edit. Despite the edit, Jones was credited on the Billboard charts. The album featured his new band The .357's, which consisted of Leroy Powell on guitar, Bryan Keeling on drums, Ted Kamp on bass with Robby Turner on steel, and backing vocals by Bonnie Bramlett.

Later that year his song "Busted In Baylor County" was then featured in the 2005 film version of The Dukes of Hazzard, furthermore Jennings portrayed his father in the Johnny Cash biopic Walk the Line alongside Joaquin Phoenix and Reese Witherspoon. His rendition of his father's song "Long Way From Home" was featured on the film's soundtrack.

Electric Rodeo and The Wolf 
Though recorded before Put the "O" Back in Country, released on April 4, 2006, Electric Rodeo was released as Jennings's second solo album. Sonically, Electric Rodeo is louder, rawer, more upfront rock and roll than its predecessor.

Electric Rodeo was followed by The Wolf on October 23, 2007. The album varied from his previous records in that the .357s had opted for a decidedly 1970s feel to the instrumentals. It featured collaborations with Doug Kershaw and The Oak Ridge Boys, as well as a cover of the Dire Straits song "Walk of Life".

That same year Jennings was featured on a duet of "Good Hearted Woman" on Deana Carter's sixth studio album, The Chain.

Departure from Universal 
In 2009, Jennings, having issues with his label and wanting out of his four-album contract released his first compilation album, Bad Magick: The Best of Shooter Jennings and the .357's. The album featured four new tracks; live versions of "Lonesome Blues", and "Daddy's Farm", as well as covers of his father's "Lonesome, Onry and Mean", and the Hank Williams, Jr. song "Living Proof".

After the release of Bad Magick: The Best of Shooter Jennings and the .357's, having fulfilled his four-album contract; Jennings parted ways with Universal records.

On March 23, 2009 Jennings took part in CMT Crossroads, a television show in which two musicians are paired with one another and perform a small concert together for an intimate crowd. The episode paired Jennings with close friend and fellow musician Jamey Johnson. The evening's set list consisted entirely of duets, including a cover of "Outlaw Shit" from the Waylon Forever album, two songs from Jennings' discography; "God Bless Alabama", "It Ain't Easy". As well as four songs from Johnson's album That Lonesome Song; "High Cost Of Living", "Mowing Down The Roses", "Between Jennings and Jones" and "In Color".

Black Ribbons 
Having left Universal, Jennings changed the name of his backing band from The .357's to Hierophant. With the news that he and his band would be joining the likes of Paramore, Bad Religion, Fall Out Boy, Jefree Star, and various other popular rock bands on the 2009 Warped Tour it became apparent that Jennings next album would differ drastically from his previous efforts.

In February 2009, it was announced that the album would be titled Black Ribbons. It was also announced that it would be a dystopian concept rock opera and that writer Stephen King would play a major role in the album as Will O' The Wisp.

It was released independently on March 2, 2010 through Black Country Rock Records, and although it was seen as a complete departure from his country sound, the album showed off the diversity as an artist and gained him much critical acclaim, as well as a brand new underground following.

On May 1, 2010, Jennings announced "Black Ribbons: The Living Album" on his Twitter account. The "Living Album" includes the full studio record and live shows with Hierophant on a USB flash drive shaped like a tarot card.
Towards the end of 2010, Jennings with the help of various other artists launched the "XXX" movement to help musicians who struggle to receive mainstream recognition.

In 2016, Jennings created and released a podcast series title "Beyond the Black" dealing with the topics and recording of Black Ribbons. The series is available on all music streaming formats as well as YouTube and the podcast's own website: www.beyondthe.black

Family Man 
In 2011, along with childhood friend and master pianist Erik Deutsch, Jennings formed The Triple Crown, a new backing band featuring Erik Deutsch on piano, Tony Leone on drums, Jeff Hill on bass, Jon Graboff on pedal steel, Eleanor Whitmore on fiddle and Chris Masterson on lead guitar.

On March 13, 2012, having signed a record deal with E1 Music, and with The Triple Crown along for the ride, Jennings returned to his country roots with the release of the album Family Man, his first self-produced outing. The album was originally meant to contain eighteen tracks, but was instead split into two albums: Family Man and 2013's The Other Life.

On July 31, 2012 Jennings was featured in Bucky Covington's debut single "The Drinking Side of Country" from the album Good Guys.

Jennings took part in the February 25 Johnny Cash 80th Birthday Bash, in which he sang Cocaine Blues With Willie Nelson and Amy Nelson. The performance was released in a DVD/CD combo.

In October 2012 Jennings was one of six commentators for the Ovation mini-series Song By Song: Johnny Cash.

The Other Life 
While recording Family Man, Jennings decided to cut the darker tracks from the album, and instead use them for the album's follow-up, The Other Life.

"Five of these songs were recorded when we were doing Family Man, and when we were deciding what to do with it we broke it up into two records. The Other Life is representative of the other side of the coin from Family Man and the way my life has been going in a lot of ways, At first we were going to call it The Outsider, but once we got into the film we thought, 'Well, it's like a mirror, a dark mirror of what Family Man was.' " - Jennings told TheBoot.com.

Jennings premiered the track "Wild & Lonesome" (featuring Patti Griffin) on the 4th season of the FX original series Sons of Anarchy. Followed by the release of first official single from the album "The White Trash Song" (featuring Scott H. Biram) which premiered on RollingStones.com along with the announcement that the album would be accompanied by a film.

The album featured seven new songs, as well as two cover songs (Harry Nilsson's "Flying Saucer song" and Steve Young's "The White Trash song") and "Outlaw You", which was put out in early 2012 as a digital release.

Jennings along with filmmaker Blake Judd released The Other Life film. Running at 32 minutes long, it utilizes six of the songs from the album as a sort of narration. The film is about a musician leaving his family to tour, but when he does so he finds the road is not the same, and becomes haunted by a mysterious woman. Throughout the film, the musician is forced to face his darker urges and deal with self-discovery, temptation, isolation and rebirth. The film closes with a short adaptation of Stephen King's The Dark Tower.

The Other Life went on to win Best Short Film at the 2013 Horror Hound Festival.

The album was also heavily featured in the 2nd season of The Punisher, of which Shooter also appears, as himself.

Black Country Rock Media 

In October 2013, Jennings announced the formation of his new label and multi-format recording company, Black Country Rock. Their initial releases included: a remastered release of the Waylon Jennings album Right for the Time, two live albums (one from Jessi Colter titled Live from Cain's Ballroom, and one from Jennings titled The Other Live), as well as a recording of "You Are My Sunshine" featuring vocals from both Jamey Johnson and Jennings. All four were released on vinyl, cassette, CD, as well as digitally.

The Magic 
On February 27, 2014, Jennings revealed he would be releasing a spoken word follow-up to Hierophant's 2010 album, Black Ribbons, titled The Magic, inspired by first story in the controversially interactive horror series thirteen.

In addition to The Magic Jennings also announced, that after nearly a decade of waiting, he would be releasing the 1995 collaborative album, Fenixon.

Both projects were released during 2014's Record Store Day, and subsequently sold out.

"George/Giorgio" releases 
Towards the end of May 2014, Jennings announced his intention to release two EP's later in the year. Don't Wait Up (for George) is a tribute to his close friend and mentor George Jones, which was released in August 2014. Jennings' seventh studio album, Countach (For Giorgio), was originally scheduled to be released in November 2014, but its release was delayed due to the sudden death of Jon Hensley, Jennings' longtime manager and friend and Black Country Rock co-founder. A tribute to 1970s electronic-music pioneer and producer, Giorgio Moroder, the album was released on February 26, 2016 and features guest vocals from Steve Young, Brandi Carlile, Marilyn Manson and Richard Garriott de Cayeux. The album became his first to enter the Dance Albums chart, peaking at number seven there.

Shooter 

Following Countach, Brandi Carlile insisted that Jennings be involved in her next project. Together with Dave Cobb, Jennings produced her 2018 album By the Way, I Forgive You, which landed six Grammy nominations, including the all-genre Album and Song of the Year categories. It won in three categories: Americana album and both best American roots song and best American roots performance (for "The Joke").

After reuniting with Dave Cobb, with whom Jennings made his first four records, Jennings, inspired by the 1984 country album Major Moves decided to shelve the album he had already been working on and instead go in a completely different direction with Cobb and make a fun, straight-ahead drinking, rockin' record. That album, titled Shooter, was released in August 2018. 
 
The following year Jennings teamed up with Brandi Carlile to produce Tanya Tucker’s 25th album, While I'm Livin'. The record, Tucker's first in 17 years, earned Grammys for Best Country Album and Best Country Song as well as Americana Award nominations for Album of the Year, Song of the Year and Artist of the Year.

Over A Cocaine Rainbow 

In late 2021 Jennings released "Leave Those Memories Alone", a tribute to his late friend and manager, Col. John Hensley. the track serves as the first single from the album "Over A Cocaine Rainbow" The record was initially slated for a 2017 release, but Jennings felt it was too "dark and experimental" to release at the time, given its subject matter and tone. Earlier that same year, Jennings released a remix of his “From Here to Eternity,” track, The new version is dubbed the "Goof the Floof Remix", a reference to something Scientology founder L. Ron Hubbard once said in an interview.

Other projects 

Since 2005, Jennings has hosted "Shooter Jennings' Electric Rodeo" on Sirius XM Outlaw Country channel. The show airs on Saturday night at 6–8 pm EST, with a replay on Sunday at 10–12 pm.
Jennings collaborated as producer with Duff McKagan for his 2019 solo album, Tenderness. The album was recorded with Jennings band, The Waters and The Suicide Horn Section, amongst others. In March 2019, a tour was announced in support of the album, featuring Jennings band playing both the support slot as well as the headline slot as the backing band for Duff.

Jennings has produced albums and tracks for numerous bands including Brandi Carlile, Marilyn Manson, Tanya Tucker and American Aquarium, as well as Jessi Colter, Jamey Johnson, Jaime Wyatt, The White Buffalo, Hellbound Glory, The Mastersons, Julie Roberts, Yelawolf, Jason Boland, Billy Don Burns, Avi Kaplan, Billy Ray Cyrus, and Angry Grandpa.

Radio show 
Jennings hosts a radio show on SiriusXM's Outlaw Country station entitled Electric Rodeo. The show's format primarily consists of country, rock, and outlaw music. The show airs Thursdays from midnight to 2:00 AM, Saturdays from 6:00 PM to 8:00 PM, and Sundays from 10:00 PM to midnight Eastern.

Style and influences 

Shooter Jennings's influences include David Bowie, Pink Floyd, Lynyrd Skynyrd, Hank Williams Jr., Nine Inch Nails, Guns N' Roses, Rage Against the Machine and Marilyn Manson. 

Rolling Stone described Jennings as a "country-rock outsider". Regarding classification of his music, Jennings said that he did not want to be pigeonholed as being solely a rock musician. Marilyn Manson argued against Jennings's work being classified as country music, saying "southern" was a more appropriate classification, noting the latter "also drags in a bit of the Stones, in a way". AllMusic described Jennings as having "established himself as an artist who played by his own rules" and said that his music is "strongly informed by both hard rock and outlaw country", while his album Black Ribbons "explored his interest in metal and electronic music".

Personal life 
Jennings is the son of country music star Waylon Jennings and Jessi Colter; he has two brothers.

On February 13, 2002, Shooter's father died in his sleep of diabetic complications in Chandler, Arizona. He was buried in the Mesa City Cemetery, in Mesa, Arizona. At the life tribute ceremony, on February 15, Shooter sang "I've Always Been Crazy" for the attendees, who included Waylon's close friends, family, and fellow musicians.

Jennings began dating actress Drea de Matteo in 2001. They have two children together, a daughter born in 2007 and a son born in 2011. Jennings and de Matteo eventually ended their relationship without marrying.

Jennings married long-time friend Misty Brooke Swain on June 4, 2013, in Joshua Tree, California. Swain and Jennings had met while he was in his rock band, Stargunn, and Swain was bartending at the Rainbow Bar & Grill. Shooter and Misty live in Hollywood, California.

Discography 

Studio albums
Put the "O" Back in Country (2005)
Electric Rodeo (2006)
The Wolf (2007)
Black Ribbons (2010)
Family Man (2012)	
The Other Life (2013)
Fenixon (with Waylon Jennings) (2014)
Don't Wait Up (for George) EP (2014)
Countach (For Giorgio) (2016)
Shooter (2018)
Sometimes Y (with Yelawolf) (2022)

Production discography 
Studio albums
Waylon Forever - Waylon Jennings & The .357s (2007)
Black Ribbons - Shooter Jennings & Hierophant (2010)	
Family Man - Shooter Jennings (2012)
Dark and Dirty Mile - Jason Boland & The Stragglers (2013)
Ashes & Angels - Fifth on the Floor (2013)
The Other Life - Shooter Jennings (2013)	
Fenixon - Fenixon (2014)	
Symbols & Snares - Last Daze (2015)
A Night in Room 8 - Billy Don Burns (2016)	
Countach (for Giorgio) - Shooter Jennings (2016)
Pinball - Hellbound Glory (2017)
By the Way, I Forgive You - Brandi Carlile (2018)
Tenderness - Duff McKagan (2019)
While I'm Livin' - Tanya Tucker (2019)
Pure Scum - Hellbound Glory (2020)
Lamentations - American Aquarium (2020)
Neon Cross - Jaime Wyatt (2020)	
No Time For Love Songs - The Mastersons (2020)	
On the Widow's Walk - The White Buffalo (2020)
We Are Chaos - Marilyn Manson (2020)	
Chasing Whiskey - Shooter Jennings, Jesse Dayton, Michael Devin & Matt Sorum (2021)	
In These Silent Days - Brandi Carlile (2021)	
The Light Saw Me - Jason Boland & The Stragglers (2021)	
Sometimes Y - Yelawolf & Shooter Jennings (2022)
Floating on a Dream - Avi Kaplan (2022)
No Regular Dog - Kelsey Waldon (2022)
The Immortal Hellbound Glory: Nobody Knows You - Hellbound Glory (2022)

EPs and singles
You Are My Sunshine - Jamey Johnson, Twiggy Ramirez & Shooter Jennings (2013)	
Don't Wait Up (for George) - Shooter Jennings (2014)
Killing The Blues - Billy Ray Cyrus (2014)
Belding's Blues - Dennis Haskins (2014)
The Most Sensible Thing - Angry Grandpa (2015)
Mama's Don't Let Your Babies Grow Up To Be Cowboys - Lukas Nelson & Shooter Jennings (2015)
A Civilized Hell - Lukas Nelson & Shooter Jennings (2016)Mixing credits'''Tenderness (Album) - Duff McKagan (2019)Sinners, Saints & Fools - Brandi Carlile (2021)The Immortal Hellbound Glory: Nobody Knows You (Album) - Hellbound Glory (2019)

 Filmography 

 Awards and nominations
 Grammy Awards 
The Grammy Awards are awarded annually by the National Academy of Recording Arts and Sciences. Jennings has won 2 awards from 5 nominations.

|-
|rowspan=3|2019
|rowspan=2|By the Way, I Forgive You|Best Americana Album
|
|-
|Album of the Year
|
|-
|"The Joke"
|Record of the Year
|
|-
|2020
|While I'm Livin'''
|Best Country Album
|
|-
|2022
|"Right on Time"
|Record of the Year
|

References

External links 
 Official Website
 
 An Interview with Shooter Jennings

1979 births
American male singer-songwriters
American country rock singers
American record producers
American people of Irish descent
American people of Dutch descent
American people of Comanche descent
Grammy Award winners
Living people
Show Dog-Universal Music artists
21st-century American singers
21st-century American male singers
Jennings family